{{Infobox film
| name           = The Secret of Roan Inish
| image          = Secretinishposter.jpg
| image_size     = 
| alt            = A young, dark-haired woman stands against a gold background with a door and the film's title in the foreground
| caption        = Theatrical release poster
| director       = John Sayles
| producer       = Sarah GreenMaggie Renzi
| screenplay     = John Sayles
| based_on       = 
| narrator       = 
| starring       = 
| music          = Mason Daring
| cinematography = Haskell Wexler
| editing        = John Sayles
| studio         = Jones Entertainment GroupSkerry Productions
| distributor    = The Samuel Goldwyn CompanyFirst Look Pictures
| released       = 
| runtime        = 103 minutes
| country        = United StatesIreland
| language       = EnglishIrish
| budget         = $5.7 million<ref name="sayles">Gerry Molyneaux, "John Sayles, Renaissance Books, 2000 p 216</ref>
| gross          = $6,159,269
}}The Secret of Roan Inish is a 1994 independent fantasy-adventure film written and directed by John Sayles. It is based on the 1957 novel Secret of the Ron Mor Skerry, by Rosalie K. Fry.

It is centered on the Irish and Orcadian folklores of selkies—seals that can shed their skins to become human. The story, set on the west coast of Ulster in the north-west of Ireland, is about Fiona, a young girl who is sent to live with her grandparents and her cousin Eamon near the island of Roan Inish, where the selkies are rumored to reside. It is a family legend that her younger brother was swept away in his infancy and raised by a selkie. Part of the film takes place in Donegal Town.

Plot
Set in 1946, the story is told from the point of view of Fiona (Jeni Courtney), a young girl who is sent to live with her grandparents in an Irish fishing village, after the death of her mother, illness of her father, and her own failing health.

In the evenings, her grandfather tells tales about the family's history, including the evacuation from their generational home on the tiny island of Roan Inish during the Second World War. Known in Irish as Rón Inis, meaning "Island of Seals", Roan Inish is a real location near Narin, a village on the west coast of County Donegal in the west of Ulster.

They live in the Ireland of tiny fishing villages, places where everyone knows one another. People live close to nature, and animals are respected and live alongside the villagers. Seals are especially respected for their special human-like spirit. It is said to be terribly wrong to harm a seal.

As she meets other villagers, Fiona hears from a distant cousin about an ancestor who married a beautiful Selkie (seal-woman). The story goes that although theirs was a marriage full of happiness, success and many children, there was always the mysterious seal-bond to the ocean. Fiona's cousin tells her that the selkie's blood runs through some of the descendants, he himself is called a "dark", down through the generations, like himself, and Fiona's baby brother Jamie.

Fiona hears details about how the sea seemed to steal her infant brother, Jamie, during the departure from Roan Inish, bobbing out of sight in his little cradle boat, some years earlier, never to be seen again.

Her cousin, Eamon, who also lives near the grandparents for his health, often accompanies the Grandfather in his curragh - fishing boat - on daily errands to the islands including Roan Inish. Quickly the bright and older Eamon becomes a partner in Fiona's plans, as the day's adventures on the sea and shore become more interesting.

Soon, on one of the visits to Roan Inish, Fiona believes that she has found Jamie romping on the strand and again, in the grass. She confides in Eamon, who warns her to not tell the grandparents for now. She observes that the seals seem to care for him, helping to feed him and play with him.

They get the idea that her grandparents should move back to Roan Inish and, when they do, the seals will return Jamie to them. The grandparents' current landlord is selling their home and they will need to move soon, but won't move to Roan Inish due to the sadness they feel at losing Jamie. Without telling them, Fiona and Eamon reason: if they must move again, why not back to the cottages they loved best?

Saying nothing to anyone about their plan, Fiona and Eamon set to the hard work of reclaiming the long-abandoned cottages on Roan Inish. They clean and restore the cottages, give them new thatch, paint, gardens, and furnishings.

After returning to her grandparents, a terrible storm rises and Fiona fears for Jamie's safety in the strong winds. She wonders aloud: "I hope he thinks to go inside the cottage." Her grandparents hear her and are in utter disbelief at her explanation.

Her grandmother is wise and unhesitant - rising to her feet and to the moment, her body and actions say: If there is any chance the child lives, when thought dead these years, rescue must be immediate.

She gathers her husband, Eamon and Fiona, they pack what they need, and climb into the curragh and make their way to Roan Inish. Racing inside, they see that Jamie is not there and the wind is rising in power and the rain has begun. The grandparents are, however, astonished and grateful to Fiona and Eamon for their secret restoration of the cottages these past few weeks.

Jamie's tiny cradle bobs to shore and he jumps out, heading for the cottages to escape the storm, shepherded to safety lovingly by the seals, as they'd probably been doing all along. But then he stops and runs back - he sees his grandparents and Eamon and Fiona, his big sister, and has no memory of them. In front of the group, grandmother calls to him to not be afraid and to come to them for love and safety - come to his family at last. Jamie remains motionless and afraid, still, then runs for his cradle, but at this point several of the seals herd him towards his family, and prevent him from returning to the cradle boat and the sea. He reluctantly makes his way into his grandmother's open arms and they make their way inside. Seeing that Jamie is safe, the seals depart.

Indoors, the victorious family are elated at the return of the child they thought dead. They wrap Jamie in a blanket and sit in front of a warm dry fire. Fiona rocks him to sleep in her arms.

Cast

 Jeni Courtney as Fiona Cone
 Eileen Colgan as Tess Coneelly
 Richard Sheridan as Eamon Coneelly
 Dave Duffy as Jim
 Pat Slowey as Priest
 Declan Hannigan as Oldest brother
 Mairéad Ní Ghallchóir as Barmaid
 Eugene McHugh as Bar Patron 1
 Tony Rubini as Bar Patron 2
 Mick Lally as Hugh Coneelly
 Michael MacCarthaigh as Schoolmaster
 Fergal McElherron as Sean Michael
 Brendan Conroy as Flynn Conneelly
 John Lynch as Tadhg Coneelly
 Susan Lynch as Nuala the Selkie
 Frankie McCafferty as Tim
 Cillian Byrne as Jamie Connelly

Production
In creating the film, John Sayles drew on original research of Celtic island lore and language, including the Blasket memoirs, a series of vernacular memoirs collected in the 1920s and '30s from residents of the Great Blasket, an island off the Kerry coast evacuated by the Irish government in 1953 and made a national park in 1989.

"Veteran cinematographer Haskell Wexler gives The Secret of Roan Inish an effortlessly elemental look. Without ostentation or self-consciousness, the film immerses you in the spume, fog and glare of the seaside life, with its temporal mysteries and its organic metamorphoses. Mason Daring's spare, traditional Irish score adds one more layer of melancholy atmosphere," noted Scott Rosenberg of SFGate. Although in the original novel the story takes place in Scotland, the filmmakers decided to have the film take place in Ireland for practical reasons. According to John Sayles in the director's commentary, most of the film was shot in County Donegal in Ulster in the north of Ireland, with some scenes being filmed on the Isle of Mull in Argyll, Scotland.

Over 1,000 girls were tested for the role of Fiona, which required the actress to be "Thin, underweight, pale complexion, but perky and not afraid of water."

Restoration
In 2020, the UCLA Film and Television Archive made a digitally restored print of the film.

Reception
Critical response
It holds a 96% "Certified Fresh" and average rating of 7.8/10 on review site Rotten Tomatoes, based on 45 reviews. Scott Rosenberg of SFGate describes it as being "a lot like the island it's named after: It seems to occupy a time of its own, cut off from the speed and overload of contemporary life and drifting to its own ancient rhythms." Critic Stephen Holden, film critic for The New York Times, liked the film's direction. He wrote, "The Secret of Roan Inish'' is the first film directed by Mr. Sayles that could be described as visually rhapsodic. Photographed by Haskell Wexler on Ireland's rugged northwestern seacoast, it is a cinematic tone poem in which man and nature, myth and reality flow together in a way that makes them ultimately indivisible."

References

External links
 
 
 
 
 The Secret of Roan Inish film trailer at YouTube

1994 films
1990s adventure films
1990s children's fantasy films
1994 fantasy films
1994 independent films
American fantasy films
American independent films
County Donegal in fiction
English-language Irish films
Films about animals
Films about mermaids
Films based on Canadian novels
Films based on Celtic mythology
Films based on British novels
Films directed by John Sayles
Films scored by Mason Daring
Films set in 1946
Films set in Ireland
Films shot in the Republic of Ireland
Films with screenplays by John Sayles
Irish fantasy films
Irish-language films
Irish independent films
1990s English-language films
1990s American films